Anders Mårtensson (17 February 1893 – 17 July 1973) was a Swedish equestrian who competed in the 1920 Summer Olympics. He finished 15th in the individual vaulting competition and won a bronze medal with the Swedish vaulting team.

References

1893 births
1973 deaths
Swedish male equestrians
Olympic equestrians of Sweden
Equestrians at the 1920 Summer Olympics
Olympic bronze medalists for Sweden
Olympic medalists in equestrian
Medalists at the 1920 Summer Olympics
Sportspeople from Lund